Drepanophorella is a genus of nemerteans belonging to the monotypic family Drepanophorellidae.

Species:
Drepanophorella lifuensis 
Drepanophorella pajungae 
Drepanophorella rosea 
Drepanophorella sebae 
Drepanophorella tasmani 
Drepanophorella waingapuensis

References

Polystilifera
Nemertea genera